The Miss Mississippi Teen USA competition is the pageant that selects the representative for the state of Mississippi in the Miss Teen USA pageant. The pageant was directed by Premier Pageants from 2001 to 2010, before becoming part of Greenwood Productions in 2010 under the ownership of Miss Tennessee USA 1989 Kim Greenwood.

Mississippi has had two Miss Teen USA placements as of 2010. They have had one Miss USA and a Miss Teen USA in 1987 becoming the 5th state that won the Miss Teen USA title for the first time, and in 2014, Vaeda Mann was 1st runner-up. Six titleholders have competed at Miss USA.

McKenzie Cole of Vicksburg was crowned Miss Mississippi Teen USA 2022 on April 2, 2022 at Pearl River Resort in Philadelphia. She will represent Mississippi for the title of Miss Teen USA 2022.

Results summary

Placements
Miss Teen USAs: Kristi Addis (1987)
1st runners-up: Vaeda Mann (2014)
3rd runners-up: Kaylee Brooke McCollum (2019)
4th runners-up: Haley Sowers (2010)
Top 10: Honey East (1988), Jennifer Reel (1998)
Top 12: Arleen McDonald (1992), Angie Carpenter (1994)
Top 16: Mattie Grace Morris (2021)
Mississippi holds a record of 9 placements at Miss Teen USA.

Awards
Miss Congeniality: Shelly Wilson (1985), Anne Elise Parks (2007), Elizabeth Hollomon (2008)

Winners 

1 Age at the time of the Miss Teen USA pageant

References

External links

Mississippi
Women in Mississippi